Trupanea ornum is a species of fruit fly in the genus Trupanea of the family Tephritidae.

Distribution
Kenya.

References

Tephritinae
Insects described in 1999
Diptera of Africa